Andrey Vladimirovich Pyatnitsky (born 27 September 1967) is a Russian-Uzbekistani association football coach and a former midfielder.

Club career
He played for a few clubs, including Spartak Moscow and Sokol Saratov.

International
In 1990, he played one match for the USSR. In 1992, he played for the CIS and then for the Uzbekistan national football team. Then he played for Russia national football team and was a participant at the 1994 FIFA World Cup.

Career statistics

International goals (CIS)

International goals (Russia)

Honours
 UEFA U-21 Championship 1990 winner
 Russian Premier League champion 1992, 1993, 1994, 1996
 Russian Premier League bronze: 1995
 Soviet Cup winner: 1992
 Russian Cup winner: 1994
 Russian Cup finalist: 1996

References

External links
Profile at RussiaTeam 

1967 births
Sportspeople from Tashkent
Living people
Soviet footballers
Soviet Union under-21 international footballers
Soviet Union international footballers
Russian footballers
Russia international footballers
Russian football managers
1994 FIFA World Cup players
Pakhtakor Tashkent FK players
PFC CSKA Moscow players
FC Spartak Moscow players
FC Sokol Saratov players
Soviet Top League players
Russian Premier League players
Dual internationalists (football)
Uzbekistan international footballers
Uzbekistani footballers
Association football midfielders
FC Orenburg managers